The Yakovlev Yak-9 is a single-engine, single-seat multipurpose fighter aircraft used by the Soviet Union and its allies during World War II and the early Cold War. It was a development of the robust and successful Yak-7B fighter, which was based in turn on the tandem-seat advanced trainer known as the Yak-7UTI. The Yak-9 started arriving in Soviet fighter regiments in late 1942 and played a major role in retaking air superiority from the Luftwaffe's new Focke-Wulf Fw 190 and  fighters during the grand Battle of Kursk in summer 1943.

The Yak-9 had a cut down rear fuselage with an unobscured canopy. Its lighter metal structure allowed for an increased fuel load and armament over previous models built from wood. The Yak-9 was manoeuvrable at high speeds when flying at low and medium altitudes and was also easy to control, qualities that allowed it to be one of most produced Soviet fighters of World War II. It was produced in different variants including the Yak-9T with the  cannon and the "large-calibre" Yak-9K with a  cannon firing through the propeller hub, which was used for antitank duty and as a potent aircraft destroyer, the fighter-bomber Yak-9B with an internal bomb bay behind cockpit for up to  worth of bombs, the long-range Yak-9D and the Yak-9DD with additional wing fuel tanks to escort bombers over Eastern Europe, and the Yak-9U with a more powerful engine and improved aerodynamics. The Yak-9 remained in production from 1942 to 1948, with 16,769 built (14,579 during the war).

After World War II, the Yak-9 would also be used by the North Korean Air Force during the Korean War.

Design and development
The Yak-9 represented further development of the successful Yakovlev Yak-7 fighter, a production version of the lightened Yak-7DI, taking full advantage of the combat experience with its predecessor. Greater availability of duralumin allowed for lighter construction which in turn permitted a number of modifications to the basic design. Yak-9 variants used two different wings, five different engines, six different fuel tank configurations and seven different armament setups.

Yak-9U 
During December 1943, the new airframe (Yak-9U) was able to use the M-107A engine, which was more powerful than the previous VK-105PF. The engine installation was new and included individual faired exhaust pipes. The oil cooler intake was moved from beneath the nose to the port wing root as well as an enlarged radiator bath being moved further aft under the fuselage. The supercharger intake was centered on the top decking of the engine cowling. The rear antenna cable was moved inside a lengthened rear canopy which provided the pilot with a better view to the rear, while the rear fuselage was cut down and the horizontal tail surfaces were slightly reduced in size. The wings and fuselage structure were made of metal which was then skinned with Bakelite. The Yak-9U was typically armed with a  ShVAK cannon firing through the hollow propeller shaft, and two  Berenzin UB machine guns.

Unlike the I-185 the Yak-9U was stable and easy to fly. However, the M-107A engine inherited the problems of the VK-105PF and was prone to overheating, oil leaks, loss of engine pressure during climbs, spark plugs constantly burning out, and intense vibrations which would fatigue assembly bolts leading to a short engine life. These defects forced the first production batches starting during April 1944  to be powered by the more reliable M-105 PF-3 engine. A total production of 1,134 aircraft were constructed by December 1944.

Operational history

Second World War
The first Yak-9 entered service in October 1942 and saw combat the same year. The Yak-9 operated with a wide variety of armament for use in anti-tank, light bomber and long-range escort roles. At low altitude, in which it operated predominantly, the Yak-9 was more maneuverable than the Bf 109. A series of improvements in performance and armament did not degrade the handling characteristics. Soviet pilots regarded the Yak-9's performance as being comparable to the Bf 109G and Fw 190A-3/A-4.
However, at the beginning of the German invasion of the Soviet Union Yak-9's performed poorly against the Luftwaffe because of a lack of training, although by the Battle of Stalingrad they began to perform better. After the Battle of Smolensk, in the second half of 1943, the famed Free French Normandie-Niémen unit became a Groupe and was equipped with the Yak-9.

The first unit to use the Yak-9U, between 25 October and 25 December 1944, was 163.IAP. Pilots were ordered not to use the engine at combat speed since this reduced its life to two or three flights only. Nevertheless, in the course of 398 sorties, the unit claimed 27 Focke-Wulf Fw 190As and one Bf 109G-2, for the loss of two Yaks in dogfights, one to flak and four in accidents. The Yak-9U contributed greatly toward the Soviets gaining air superiority, and the Germans learned to avoid the Yaks “without antenna mast”.

A large formation of the Yak-9DD version was transferred to Bari (the capital of Apulia, in Italy) to help Yugoslav partisans in the Balkans.

One of the top-scoring Yak-9 pilots was First Lieutenant A.I. Vybornov. Flying a type-T (equipped with a 37mm NS-37 cannon in the nose) he achieved 19 air victories, plus nine shared and was awarded the Gold Star Medal of the Hero of the Soviet Union in June 1945. At the end of the war, on 22 March 1945, Lieutenant L.I. Sivko from 812th IAP achieved an air victory against a Messerschmitt Me 262 jet fighter, but he was killed soon afterward by another Me 262, probably piloted by Franz Schall, a top-scoring Me 262 pilot.

Fighter units with this aircraft suffered lower losses than average. Of 2,550 Yak-9s manufactured up the end of 1943, only 383 were lost in combat.

Post-war era
At the beginning of the Cold War, Yak-9 fighters began buzzing American, British, and French flights in the air corridors to West Berlin. During the Berlin Blockade, Yak-9 fighters interfered with the U.S. Air Force-Royal Air Force airlift. During 1949, the Soviet Union provided surplus Yak-9P (VK-107) aircraft to some satellite states in the Soviet bloc to help them rebuild their air forces following the West Berlin blockade. A section of the aircraft's operating manual was accidentally omitted from the translation from Russian into some languages: before starting the Yak-9, it was necessary to hand-crank a small cockpit-mounted oil pump 25 times to provide initial lubrication to the Klimov V12 engine, unlike World War II German and Western fighters equipped with forced closed-cycle lubrication systems. Skipping this unusual but vital step resulted in frequent engine seizures during the takeoff roll and initial climb, causing several fatalities during 1950.

Variants

Yakovlev OKB created 22 modifications of the Yak-9, of which 15 saw mass production. The most notable of these include:
Yak-9
Yak-9 (M-106)
It did not advance to production because of problems with the engine.
Yak-9T
A Yak-9 armed with a  Nudelman-Suranov NS-37 cannon with 30 rounds instead of the  ShVAK.  The cockpit was moved  back to compensate for the heavier nose. A problem corrected during prototype tests was poor quality control that led to multiple oil and coolant leaks from cannon recoil. Recoil and a limited supply of ammunition required accurate aiming and two- or three-round bursts. The Yak-9T was widely used against enemy shipping on the Black Sea and against tanks the cannon could penetrate up to  armor from  but was also successful against aircraft: a single cannon hit was usually sufficient to tear apart the target. Virage (constant altitude and velocity turn) time was 18–19 seconds. 2748 were produced.

Yak-9K
A Yak-9T modified with a  NS-45 cannon with 29 rounds and a distinctive muzzle brake to deal with the massive recoil. Firing the cannon at speeds below  caused a dramatic loss of control and tossed the pilot back and forth in the cockpit; however, accurate shooting was possible at higher speeds and in two- to three-round bursts. The recoil also caused numerous oil and coolant leaks. The heavy cannon decreased performance dramatically, especially at high altitudes, to the point that Yak-9Ks were relegated to heavy fighter duty and had to be escorted by Yak-3s. The Yak-9K saw only limited use due to the unreliability of the NS-45 and to airframe performance issues caused by the NS-45 and by the larger fuel tanks used on the Yak-9K; it also saw little use because of a reduced number of German bombers.

Yak-9D
Its combat usefulness at full range was limited by a lack of radio navigation equipment, and a number of aircraft were used as short-range fighters with fuel carried only in inner wing tanks. The time to complete a circle was 19–20 seconds.
Yak-9TD
A Yak-9D with an NS-37 cannon and provision for 4 ×  FAB-50 bombs under the wings.
Yak-9B
A fighter-bomber version of the Yak-9D (factory designation Yak-9L) with four vertical tube bomb bays aft of the cockpit with capacity for up to 4 ×  FAB-100 bombs or 4 PTAB cassettes with 32 ×  bomblets each, although normally only  of weapons were carried in the front bomb bays. Poor handling with a full bomb and fuel load and lack of special aiming equipment limited its combat usefulness.
Yak-9DD
Radio navigation equipment for night and poor weather flying was added. The Yak-9DD was used primarily to escort Petlyakov Pe-2 and Tupolev Tu-2 bombers although it proved less than ideal for this role due to an insufficient speed advantage over the bombers. In 1944, several Yak-9DD fighters were used to escort B-17 Flying Fortress and B-24 Liberator bombers attacking targets in Romania using the Ukraine-Romania-Italy routes.
Yak-9M
A Yak-9D with the cockpit moved  to the rear like the Yak-9T, as well as numerous fixes and improvements based on experience with previous versions.
Yak-9M PVO

Yak-9 MPVO
A single-seat night fighter aircraft, equipped with a searchlight and an RPK-10 radio compass.
Yak-9S
A Yak-9M with a Klimov VK-105PF engine, a new propeller, and armament consisting of 1 ×  Nudelman-Suranov NS-23 cannon with 60 rounds, and 2 ×  Berezin B-20 cannons with 120 rounds. It did not enter production due to its poor performance compared to the Yak-3 and Yak-9U.
Yak-9R
A single-seat tactical reconnaissance aircraft.
Yak-9P

This aircraft was the last and the most advanced version of the Yak-9 fighter, which became the pinnacle of development among A. S. Yakovlev's piston-engined fighters. The Yak-9P (Product P) that appeared in 1946 was a modification of the Yak-9U fighter of composite construction. Unlike its predecessor, it had all-metal wings with elliptical tips. By this time, the manufacture of high-strength aluminum alloys was established in the Soviet Union, simplifying aircraft operation and increasing aircraft service life.
Yak-9P (VK-107)
A Yak-9U with an all-metal wing. "Yak-9P" in this case was a factory designation different from the Yak-9P with two ShVAKs described above.
Yak-9PD
A high-altitude interceptor (unrelated to the two other Yak-9P variants described above) with the Klimov M-105PD engine, designed specifically to intercept Luftwaffe Junkers Ju 86P high-altitude reconnaissance aircraft overflying Moscow in 1942–1943. Poor performance due to the unreliable engine dramatically improved with adoption of the Klimov M-106PV with water injection, with the aircraft reaching  during testing. The armament was reduced to the ShVAK cannon only to save weight.
Yak-9U (VK-105)
A Yak-9T with the Klimov VK-105PF2 engine and numerous aerodynamic and structural improvements introduced with the Yak-3. The main visual difference from the Yak-9T was in the oil coolers in the wing roots, like on the Yak-3, and in that plywood covered the fuselage, instead of fabric. It differed visually from the Yak-3 only by the main landing gear covers. The armament increased to 1 ×  VYa cannon with 60 rounds and 2 ×  UBSs with 170 rounds each. The VYa cannon could be replaced by a ShVAK, B-20, or NS-37, the latter requiring removal of the starboard UBS machine gun. It did not enter production because the VYa was considered unsatisfactory and because the one cannon, one machine gun armament seen on previous models offered a significant increase in range.
Yak-9U (VK-107)
The definitive Yak-9 variant, the Yak-9U (VK-105) was equipped with the new  Klimov VK-107A engine, and with the  ShVAK with 120 rounds replacing the VYa cannon. Early test flights in 1943 indicated that the only comparable Soviet fighter was the Polikarpov I-185 prototype which was more difficult to fly and less agile due to higher weight. Early problems with overheating were fixed by enlarging the radiators and production aircraft had further improved aerodynamics. The time to complete a circle was 23 seconds. It was the best Soviet fighter at high altitude.
Yak-9UV
A two-seat trainer version of the Yak-9U (VK-107) with armament reduced to a single Berezin B-20 cannon with 100 rounds. It did not enter production due to the introduction of jet aircraft.
Yak-9UT
Similarly to the Yak-9TK, it could be converted to replace the N-37 with a  B-20,  NS-23, or  N-45. Production aircraft carried the NS-23 instead of the N-37 cannon as the default armament.
Yak-9-57
The Yak-9-57 was a one-off conversion of a Yak-9UT armed with a 57 mm cannon. The large caliber cannon did not protrude from the spinner cone like the Yak-9-37/45 models.
Yak-9V
A two-seat trainer version of Yak-9M and Yak-9T with the Klimov VK-105PF2 engine and with armament reduced to 1 ×  ShVAK with 90 rounds.

Modern replicas
In the early 1990s, Yakovlev started limited production for the warbird market of Yak-9 and Yak-3 replica aircraft using original World War II equipment and Allison V-1710 engines.  These modern-built replicas using the Allison engines, have counterclockwise-rotation props, unlike the originals which strictly used clockwise-rotation Soviet V12 powerplants.

Operators

 Albanian Air Force received 72 aircraft in 1947, including 12 Yak-9V trainers.

 Bulgarian Air Force

 People's Liberation Army Air Force

 French Air Force (Armée de l'Air)
 Normandie-Niemen squadron

 Hungarian Air Force received aircraft in 1949. The type's Hungarian name was "Vércse" (Kestrel).
 received 34 aircraft in late June 1945.

 North Korean Air Force

 Air Force of the Polish Army
 Polish Air Force operated several aircraft from 1947 to 1953.
 Polish Navy

 Soviet Air Force
 Soviet Air Defence Forces

 SFR Yugoslav Air Force – 16 Yak-9T, 40 Yak-9P, 47 Yak-9D/M and 68 Yak-9V aircraft in 1944–1950/1960
 111th Fighter Aviation Regiment (1947–1948)
 112th Fighter Aviation Regiment (1947–1948)
 94th Fighter Aviation Regiment (1948–1952)
 116th Fighter Aviation Regiment (1948–1950)
 117th Fighter Aviation Regiment (1948–1950)
 141st Training Aviation Regiment (1952–1953)
 2nd Training Aviation Regiment (1946–1948)
 101st Fighter-Training Aviation Regiment (1948–1950)
 103rd Reconnaissance Aviation Regiment (1950–1951)
 104th Training Aviation Regiment (1948–1950)
 Training Squadron of 32nd Aviation Division (1953–1959)
 Training Squadron of 39th Aviation Division (1953–1959)
 Training Squadron of 44th Aviation Division (1953–1954)

Surviving aircraft

Bulgaria
 Yak-9P on display at the Aviation Museum in Krumovo, Plovdiv. It is tactical number 27.

North Korea
 Yak-9P on display at Victorious War Museum in Pyongyang.

Poland
 Yak-9P on static display at the Museum of the Polish Navy in Gdynia, Pomerania. It is tactical number 2 and was used by the Navy Aviation Escadrille until 1956. On 12 December 1956, it was transferred to the museum on behalf of the Navy Command.
 Yak-9P on static display at the Museum of the Polish Army in Warsaw, Mazovia. It is tactical number 23 and was used by the 1st Fighter Aviation Regiment from 1947 until 1950. It was transferred to the museum on 10 August 1950 on behalf of the Air Force Command.

Russia
 Yak-9U on static display at the Central Air Force Museum in Monino, Moscow Oblast.
 Yak-9 on static display at the Vadim Zadorozhny Museum of Technology in Krasnogorsky District, Moscow Oblast.
 Yak-9 on static display at the Museum of the Air Forces of the Northern Fleet in Safonovo, Murmansk Oblast.

Serbia
 Yak-9P in storage at the Aeronautical Museum Belgrade in Surčin, Belgrade.

Ukraine
 Yak-9 on static display at the National Museum of the History of Ukraine in the Second World War in Kyiv.

United States
 Yak-9U on static display at the Museum of Flight in Seattle, Washington.

Specifications (Yak-9U)

See also

References

Notes

Citations

Bibliography
 Angelucci, Enzo and Paolo Matricardi. World Aircraft: World War II, Volume II (Sampson Low Guides). Maidenhead, UK: Sampson Low, 1978. .
 Bergström, Christer. Bagration to Berlin – The final Air Battle in the East 1944–45. Hersham, UK: Classic Publications, 2008. .
 Bock, Robert. Yak-7, Yak-9 (Aircraft Monograph 14) (English translation of Polish original). Gdańsk, Poland: AJ-Press, 1999. .
 Drabkin, Artem. The Red Air Force at War: Barbarossa and The Retreat to Moscow – Recollections of Fighter Pilots on the Eastern Front.  Barnsley, South Yorkshire, UK: Pen & Sword Military, 2007. .
 Gordon, Yefim and Dmitri Khazanov. Soviet Combat Aircraft of the Second World War, Volume One: Single-Engined Fighters. Earl Shilton, Leicester, UK: Midland Publishing Ltd., 1998. .
 Green, William. Warplanes of the Second World War, Volume Three: Fighters. London: Macdonald & Co. (Publishers) Ltd., 1961 (seventh impression 1973). .
 Green, William and Gordon Swanborough. WW2 Aircraft Fact Files: Soviet Air Force Fighters, Part 2. London: Macdonald and Jane's Publishers Ltd., 1978. .
 Gunston, Bill. Aerei della 2ª Guerra Mondiale (in Italian ). Milan: Alberto Peruzzo Editore, 1984. NO ISBN.
 Gunston, Bill. The illustrated Directory of Fighting Aircraft of World War II. London: Salamander Book Limited, 1988. .
 Kopenhagen, W., ed. Das große Flugzeug-Typenbuch (in German). Stuggart, Germany: Transpress, 1987. .
 Leonard, Herbert. Encyclopaedia of Soviet Fighters 1939–1951. Paris: Histoire & Collections, 2005. .
 Liss, Witold. The Yak 9 Series (Aircraft in Profile number 185). Leatherhead, Surrey, UK: Profile Publications Ltd., 1967.
 Mellinger, George. Yakovlev Aces of World War 2. Botley, UK: Osprey Publishing Ltd., 2005. .
 Morgan, Hugh. Gli assi Sovietici della Seconda guerra mondiale (in Italian). Milano: Edizioni del Prado/Osprey Aviation, 1999. .
 Morgan, Hugh. Soviet Aces of World War 2. London: Reed International Books Ltd., 1997. .
 Panek, Robert. Yakovlev Yak-9U & P. Sandomierz, Poland/Redbourn, Hertfordshire, UK: Mushroom Model Publications, 2006. .
 Шавров, В.Б. История конструкций самолетов в СССР 1938–1950 гг. (3 изд.). Kniga:  Машиностроение, 1994 (Shavrov, V.B. Istoriia konstruktskii samoletov v SSSR, 1938–1950 gg.,3rd ed. History of Aircraft Design in USSR: 1938–1950). Kniga, Russia: Mashinostroenie, 1994.) .
 Stapfer, Hans-Heiri. Yak Fighters in Action (Aircraft number 78). Carrollton, Texas: Squadron/Signal Publications, Inc., 1986. .
 Степанец, А.Т. Истребители ЯК периода Великой Отечественной войны. Kniga: Машиностроение, 1992. Stepanets, A.T. Istrebiteli Yak perioda Velikoi Otechestvennoi voiny (Yak Fighters of the Great Patriotic War). Kniga, Russia: Mashinostroenie, 1992. .
 Williams, Anthony G. and Emmanuel Gustin. Flying Guns: The Development of Aircraft Guns, Ammunition and Installations 1933–45. Ramsbury, UK: Airlife, 2003. .
 Якубович, Н.В. Истребитель Як-9. Заслуженный «фронтовик». Москва: Коллекция, Яуза, ЭКСМО, 2008. Yakubovich, N.V. Istrebitel’ Yak-9. Zasluzhenny ”frontovik” (Yak-9 Fighter. A Honored “Veteran”). Moscow, Russia: Collection, Yauza, EKSMO, 2008. .

Low-wing aircraft
Yakovlev Yak-09
Yak-009
World War II Soviet fighter aircraft
Single-engined tractor aircraft
Aircraft first flown in 1942
Retractable conventional landing gear